Kolbermoor is a town in the district of Rosenheim, in Bavaria, Germany.

It is situated 5 km west of Rosenheim on the river Mangfall.

In 1859 Kolbermoor railway stop was built for the new Bavarian Maximilian's Railway. Kolbermoor became a village in 1863 and a town in 1963.

A museum of local history and industry is located in Kolbermoor.

Kolbermoor is the birthplace of football players Paul Breitner and Bastian Schweinsteiger.

On 9 February 2016 the Bad Aibling rail accident occurred between Kolbermoor and Bad Aibling-Kurpark to the west.

References

Rosenheim (district)